Llapashticë e Epërme is a village in Podujevë municipality.

Notes

References 

Villages in Podujevo